The 1938 Carnegie Tech Tartans football team represented the Carnegie Institute of Technology during the 1938 college football season. The Tartans were led by second-year head coach Bill Kern and played their home games at Pitt Stadium in Pittsburgh, Pennsylvania.

The team first came to national attention after winning a close game against Northeastern power Holy Cross, who were on a 13-game unbeaten streak. Another big win came when the Tartans upset cross-town rival and defending national champion Pittsburgh, snapping their 22-game winning streak.

The Tartans were awarded the third ever Lambert Trophy, distinguishing them as the best college football team in the East. They were invited to their first and only bowl game in school history, the Sugar Bowl in New Orleans, where they led at halftime but lost to national champion TCU,

Schedule

References

Carnegie Tech
Carnegie Mellon Tartans football seasons
Lambert-Meadowlands Trophy seasons
Carnegie Tech Tartans football